KBEY (103.9FM) is a radio station broadcasting a Country format. Licensed to Burnet, Texas, United States, it serves the Burnet, Marble Falls, Horseshoe Bay, Kingsland, Highland Lakes/Burnet County, Texas area.  The station is currently owned by John Daniel and Merri Lee Alvey, through licensee Victory Publishing Company, Ltd.

External links
 

Country radio stations in the United States
BEY